Notoxus monoceros is a black and brown species of beetle that is about 4 millimeters long and resembles ants. The species markings are variable, it is usually found in sandy places, and it has a forward projection ("horn") on the pronotum.

References

External links
Wbrc

Aderidae
Articles containing video clips